The University of Lausanne (UNIL) in Lausanne, Switzerland was founded in 1537 as a school of Protestant theology, before being made a university in 1890. The university is the second oldest in Switzerland, and one of the oldest universities in the world to be in continuous operation. As of fall 2017, about 15,000 students and 3,300 employees studied and worked at the university. Approximately 1,500 international students attend the university (120 nationalities), which has a wide curriculum including exchange programs with other universities.

Since 2005, the university follows the requirements of the Bologna process. The 2011 Times Higher Education World University Rankings ranked the University of Lausanne 116th globally. The CWTS Leiden Ranking 2015 ranks the University of Lausanne 11th in Europe and 41st globally, out of 750 universities.

Together with the École polytechnique fédérale de Lausanne (EPFL) the university forms a vast campus at the shores of Lake Geneva.

History 

The university was founded in 1537 as the Schola Lausannensis, one year after Bern annexed the territory of Barony of VaudVaud from the Duchy of Savoy, as a school of theology with the purpose of training pastors for the church. It enjoyed great renown in its early years for being the first and, until the establishment of the Academy of Geneva in 1559, the only French-language Protestant school of theology. It quickly became a center of humanist learning, with thinkers such as Corderius and Celio Secondo Curione among its professors. In 1558, the school had 700 students. It entered into a period of decline in the following years, after several members of the academic staff, including rector Theodore Beza and Pierre Viret, resigned their seats to join the newly established Academy of Geneva.

In the 17th century, the institution became known as the Academy of Lausanne (Académie de Lausanne). In 1741, it counted 150 students and seven professors. Starting in 1837, the academy was modernized by the authorities of the canton of Vaud, becoming a secular institution  divided into three faculties (letters and sciences, theology, and law). It continued to expand throughout the second half of the 19th century, until 1890, with the establishment of a medicine course, the academy received the name and status of a university.

From 1970, the university moved progressively from the old centre of Lausanne, around the Cathedral and Château, to its present site at Dorigny.

The end of the 20th century, witnessed the beginnings of an ambitious project aiming at greater co-operation and development among the French-speaking universities of Lausanne, Geneva, and Neuchâtel, together with the Swiss Federal Institute of Technology in Lausanne (EPFL). Among others, this led to the transfer of the sections of Mathematics, Physics and Chemistry from the university to the EPFL; the funds that were made available following this transfer were invested in the development of the life sciences at the university, including the creation of a Center for Integrative Genomics.

In 2003, two new faculties were founded, concentrating on the life and human sciences: the Faculty of Biology and Medicine and the Faculty of Geosciences and Environment.

On 1 January 2014, the Swiss Graduate School of Public Administration (IDHEAP) was integrated into the University of Lausanne.

Since August 2021, the rector of the University of Lausanne is Frédéric Herman; before then, the university was led by Nouria Hernandez (2016–2021) and by Dominique Arlettaz (2006–2016).

Faculties and schools 

The University of Lausanne comprises seven faculties:

 Faculty of Arts (Faculté des lettres)
 Faculty of Biology and Medicine (FBM)
 Faculty of Business and Economics (HEC), also called HEC Lausanne
 Faculty of Geosciences and Environment (GSE)
 Faculty of Law, Criminal Justice and Public Administration (FDSC), including the Swiss Graduate School of Public Administration
 Faculty of Social and Political Sciences (SSP)
 Faculty of Theology and Religious Studies (FTSR)

The University of Lausanne also comprises schools and different sections, including but not limited to:

 School of Criminal Justice (ESC)
 School of French as a Foreign Language (EFLE)
 French summer and winter courses (Cours de vacances)
 Science-Society Interface

Campus

Main campus 

The main campus is presently situated outside the city of Lausanne, on the shores of Lake Léman, in Dorigny. It is adjacent to the Swiss Federal Institute of Technology in Lausanne (EPFL) and is served by the Lausanne Metro Line 1 (M1). The two schools together welcome about 20,000 students.

The UNIL and the EPFL share an active sports centre located on the campus, on the shores of Lake Geneva and their campus is also equipped with a bicycle sharing system.

The university campus is made up of individual buildings with a park and arboretum in between. The university library also serves as eating hall and is centrally located. The view from the library across the sports fields to the lake of Geneva and the French and Swiss Alps. On a clear day, Mont Blanc can be seen.

The Swiss Institute of Comparative Law and the central administration of the Swiss Institute of Bioinformatics are also located on the main campus.

Other sites 

In addition to its main campus at the lakeside, the University of Lausanne also has other sites. The Faculty of Biology and Medicine is also located in two other sites: around the University Hospital of Lausanne (CHUV) (site called Bugnon) and in Épalinges (to the north of Lausanne).

The Department of Biochemistry, the Ludwig Cancer Research branch of the University of Lausanne and the WHO Immunology Research and Training Centre and some laboratories of the University Hospital of Lausanne are located in Épalinges. The Biopôle was built next to the Épalinges campus. The Faculty of Biology and Medicine also comprises a fourth site, the Psychiatric Hospital of Cery, in Prilly.

Associated institutions

Reputation and rankings 

The University of Lausanne is consistently ranked among the top 100 universities in the world. Between 2010 and 2018, the Leiden Ranking (CWTS) ranked the University of Lausanne 57th-98th globally, and 15th-38th among all universities in Europe. According to the Times Higher Education World University Rankings (THE), the University of Lausanne ranked 62nd in life sciences worldwide (4th in Switzerland) in 2017. The QS World University Rankings (QS) placed the University of Lausanne 96th in life science and medicine. The Academic Ranking of World Universities (ARWU) ranked the University of Lausanne 101-150 globally.

Below are rankings for the University of Lausanne by the Leiden Ranking (CWTS).

Press

The UNIL publishes a free monthly campus magazine entitled L'Uniscope The UNIL also publishes Allez savoir !, a free magazine aimed at a larger audience (general public), in January, May, and September.

Besides these, L'auditoire is the students' newspapers from both UNIL and EPFL, with a circulation of 19,000.

Alumni

ALUMNIL network 

In 2011, an on-line network of the UNIL alumni, called ALUMNIL, was created. Since then, regular events (throughout the year) and an annual party (in autumn) are organised every year for the alumni.

Royalty 
 King Ananda Mahidol (Rama VIII) of Thailand (1925-1946)
 King Bhumibol Adulyadej (Rama IX) of Thailand (1927-2016)
 Princess Galyani Vadhana of Thailand
 Prince Bernhard of the Netherlands
 Princess Vera Ignatievna Giedroyc, Lithuanian princess and Russian-Ukrainian surgeon

Politics 
 Ignazio Cassis, President of the Swiss Confederation
 İsmail Cem, Minister of Foreign Affairs of Turkey
 Paul Ceresole, President of the Swiss Confederation
 Georges-André Chevallaz, President of the Swiss Confederation
 Pascal Couchepin, President of the Swiss Confederation
 Ernest Chuard, President of the Swiss Confederation
 Jean-Pascal Delamuraz, President of the Swiss Confederation
 Vedat Dicleli, Minister of Economy & Trade of Turkey
 Daniel-Henri Druey, President of the Swiss Confederation
Florika Fink-Hooijer, prominent European civil servant
 Constant Fornerod, President of the Swiss Confederation
 Şemsettin Günaltay, Prime Minister of Turkey
 Max Huber, Swiss international lawyer and diplomat, President of the International Committee of the Red Cross* Antoine Louis John Ruchonnet, President of the Swiss Confederation
 Fazıl Küçük, first Vice President of the Republic of Cyprus
 Pascoal Mocumbi, Prime Minister of Mozambique
 Benito Mussolini, Prime Minister of Italy, Duce of Italy
 Marguerite Narbel (1918–2010), member of the Grand Council of Vaud
 Marcel Pilet-Golaz, President of the Swiss Confederation
 Eugène Ruffy, President of the Swiss Confederation
 Marc-Emile Ruchet, President of the Swiss Confederation
 Mohammad Sa'ed, Prime Minister of Iran
 Jonas Savimbi, leader of UNITA, an anti-Communist rebel group in Angola
 Lutz Graf Schwerin von Krosigk, Leading Minister of the German Reich
 Jean-Luc Addor Swiss politician
 Samuel Bendahan Swiss politician
 Christine Wohlwend, (born 1978), Liechtensteiner politician

Business 
 Jean-Claude Biver, CEO of Hublot
 Louis C. Camilleri, CEO of Philip Morris International
 Jean Claude Gandur, CEO of Addax Petroleum

Literature 
 Philippe Jaccottet, Swiss poet
 Mohammad-Ali Jamalzadeh, prominent Iranian writer
 Edmond Pidoux, Swiss poet and novelist
 Charles Ferdinand Ramuz, Swiss writer

Scholars 
 Jacques Dubochet (1942–), biophysicist and co-laureate of the Nobel Prize in Chemistry 2017.
 Pierre Gilliard (1879–1962), French professor, Legion of Honour recipient 
 Leo Aryeh Mayer (1895–1959), rector of the Hebrew University of Jerusalem.
 Vilfredo Pareto (1848–1923) Economist, engineer, sociologist, philosopher, Professor of Economics at University of Lausanne, co-founder of the Lausanne School of economics, together with Léon Walras
 Jean Piccard (1884–1963), Swiss-born American chemist, engineer, professor and high-altitude balloonist.
 Martine Rebetez (1961–), Swiss climatologist
 Georges de Rham (1903–1990), Swiss mathematician, known for his contributions to differential topology.
 Pedro Rossello (1897–1970), Catalonian educator and Deputy Director of the International Bureau of Education.
 Jean de Serres (1540–1598), French humanist, Plato translator, Calvinist.
 Léon Walras (1834–1910) Economist, Professor of Economics at University of Lausanne, co-founder of the Lausanne School of economics, together with: Vilfredo Pareto
 Luc E. Weber (1941–), Rector Emeritus of the University of Geneva
 Alexandre Yersin (1863–1943), Swiss-French physician, co-discoverer of the bacillus responsible for the bubonic plague.
 Zaharina Dimitrova (1873–1940), Bulgarian doctor, Order of Civil Merit recipient, philanthropist.
 Marguerite Narbel (1918–2010), Swiss biologist

Others 
 Sepp Blatter, President of FIFA
 Murielle Bochud, Swiss physician who is the co-chief of the Department of Epidemiology and Health Systems at the Unisanté in Lausanne
Abraham Davel, independence hero of the Canton of Vaud
 Akbar Etemad, president of the Atomic Energy Organisation of Iran
 Christophe Keckeis, Head of the Swiss Army
 Claude Nicollier, Swiss astronaut
 Bertrand Piccard, Swiss psychiatrist and balloonist
 Nikolaus Senn (1926–2014), co-director of Schweizerische Bankgesellschaft

School of Lausanne 
Neoclassical school of thought in economics founded at the University of Lausanne by two of its professors: Léon Walras and Vilfredo Pareto. The School of Lausanne is associated with the development of general equilibrium theory as well as the marginalist revolution.

See also 
 Charles Guillaume Loys de Bochat
 List of largest universities by enrollment in Switzerland
 List of modern universities in Europe (1801–1945)
 List of universities in Switzerland
 Cantonal and University Library of Lausanne
 International Academy of Sport Science and Technology (AISTS)
 Jean Monnet Foundation for Europe
 Swiss School of Archaeology in Greece
 University Hospital of Lausanne (CHUV)

Notes and references

Bibliography 
  Jean-Philippe Leresche, Frédéric Joye-Cagnard, Martin Benninghoff and Raphaël Ramuz, Gouverner les universités. L'exemple de la coordination Genève-Lausanne (1990-2010), Presses polytechniques et universitaires romandes, 2012.
  Nadja Maillard, L'Université de Lausanne à Dorigny, Éditions Infolio, 488 pages, 2013.

External links 

  
 Cantonal and University Library of Lausanne  

 
1537 establishments in Europe
16th-century establishments in Switzerland
Education in Lausanne
Educational institutions established in the 1530s